Bazabeel Norman (July 12, 1750 – July 17, 1830) was an American soldier, farmer, and landowner.

Name
"Basil" was his birth name according to the 1750 court records but, due to the lack of 18th century English spelling conformity, he was also known as Bazabeel, Bazaleel, Bazel, Bazil, Bazael, Bazzell and Bazlo.

Military career
Norman was a free mulatto (biracial) Revolutionary War soldier serving in the 7th Maryland Regiment under the command of Colonel John Gunby from June 6, 1777, until July 31, 1783. His mother was a mulatto indentured servant of British and African ancestry named Jane and his grandmother, Elizabeth, arrived in America as an indentured servant from Great Britain. His father was a free "mulatto" man. Basil also served an indenture until age 21 but was never enslaved, nor were his descendants. He was the second landowner of color in the state of Ohio. The first was Richard Fisher whose daughter, Mary Anne Fisher, married Basil's son Aquila. 

His direct descendant Major Henry A. Norman was a Tuskegee Airman who fought in World War II. Basil is a great-great-great-grandfather of American opera singer Maria Ewing, four times great-grandfather of her daughter, actress Rebecca Hall and sixth generation ancestor of jazz musician Wilbur L. Norman (March 5, 1926 - January 8, 2016).

At least three of Norman's descendants served and died from wounds suffered in the U.S. Civil War, Azariah Norman (1827 - September 24, 1864, buried Arlington National Cemetery), Henry L. Norman (April 4, 1834 - died Andersonville Prison, July 4, 1864) and Horace Norman (1843 - April 24, 1865, buried Hampton National Cemetery). A bronze plaque in Mound Cemetery in Marietta, Ohio, set by the Daughters of the American Revolution, commemorates Basil Norman and his Revolutionary War service. (There is an error in Basil's birth date on the plaque.) In 1825, General Lafayette of France, who fought with the Americans during the Revolution, visited Marietta. He said of the city's veterans: "I knew them well. I saw them fighting the battles of their country". They were the bravest of the brave. Better men never lived."  

Basil Norman fought in at least five major military battles/campaigns. He wrote: "I was in the Battles of Monmouth [28 June 1778], Campden [sic: Battle of Camden SC, 16 Aug 1780], Cowpens [17 Jan 1781] Gilford Courthouse [sic: Guilford Courthouse NC, 15 Mar 1781] & the Eutaw springs [SC, 8 Sep 1781]". He is one of Maryland's veterans who received land in western Allegheny County by lottery for service during the Revolutionary War. His allotment, Lot #1281, contained a stream with a waterfall and is now a State Park.

Norman's obituary was published in the American Friend & Marietta Gazette newspaper on Saturday, July 24, 1830:

"Casualty. – On Saturday evening last Mr. Bazil Norman, of Roxbury Township, a man of color, left his house to go to watch a deer lick, and not returning in the course of the night, the next day a search was commenced under the belief that some accident had befallen him; after a diligent search by his family and neighbors, he was found dead hav-ing fallen from a precipice about twelve feet From appearances he had been to the lick and stayed the usual time, and late in the evening attempted to return, by the aid of a torch light; having a narrow pass to descend between some rocks about a half mile from the house, he missed his way a few yards, fell, and broke his neck. Mr. Norman was aged about 73 years – was a soldier in the revolutionary war, and at the time of his death received a pension from the United States."

His wife Fortune Stevens Norman applied for (April 14, 1837), and received, his $9.00 military pension seven years after his death.

References

External links 
 

1750 births
1830 deaths
African Americans in the American Revolution
Pre-emancipation African-American history
Black Patriots
People from Frederick, Maryland
Military personnel from Maryland